Wilsden railway station was a station on the Queensbury Lines which ran between Keighley, Bradford and Halifax.

History
It was closer to the small hamlet of Harecroft, West Yorkshire, England.

The station had two platforms and a large goods shed. It was the last station to open on the Queensbury-Keighley section of the line.

References

External links
 Wilsden station on navigable 1947 O. S. map

Disused railway stations in Bradford
Former Great Northern Railway stations
Railway stations in Great Britain opened in 1886
Railway stations in Great Britain closed in 1955